"Splash!" is the forty-second single by B'z, released on June 7, 2006. This song is one of B'z many number-one singles in Oricon charts.
Splash! was re-recorded in 2012 with English lyrics and released as part of the band's iTunes-exclusive English album

Track listing 
Splash - 3:33
MVP - 3:55

Limited Edition I 
Splash - 3:33
MVP - 3:55
CD+DVD Ai no Bakudan

Limited Edition II 
Splash - 3:33
MVP - 3:55
CD+DVD Fever

Limited Edition III 
Splash - 3:33
MVP - 3:55
CD+DVD Pulse

Certifications

References 
 Oricon ranking as of June 2006

External links 
 B'z official website

2006 singles
B'z songs
Oricon Weekly number-one singles
Songs written by Tak Matsumoto
Songs written by Koshi Inaba